Aukusti Pasanen (8 August 1902, Juva – 10 July 1986) was a Finnish lawyer, civil servant and politician. He was a Member of the Parliament of Finland from 1951 to 1958, representing the People's Party of Finland.

References

1902 births
1986 deaths
People from Juva
People from Mikkeli Province (Grand Duchy of Finland)
People's Party of Finland (1951) politicians
Members of the Parliament of Finland (1951–54)
Members of the Parliament of Finland (1954–58)
Finnish military personnel of World War II